Murray is an unincorporated community in Shoshone County, Idaho, United States. It is twenty miles from Wallace along Dobson Pass Road. Prichard Creek flows through the community, forming a thin and deep valley in the surrounding Coeur d'Alene Mountains.

History
The community was named for George Murray, a mining prospector.  Murray was one of several boisterous mining camps that became active in the late 1880s in Northern Idaho. Mines operated in the area from the 1880s to the 1950s. In 1884, a judge fined Wyatt Earp $65 for claim jumping after he forced William Payne off his land at gunpoint near Murray.

There was never a Northern Pacific line serving Murray. The line was built by the Idaho Northern Railroad in 1908. The Idaho Northern was taken over by the Oregon–Washington Railroad and Navigation Company (OWR & N) on March 1, 1911. It served as a branch line from Enaville, Idaho until the 1933 flood washed out much of the line. It was then abandoned.  A Northern Pacific railroad line served the community for two years during the 1910s.

A post office was established at Murray in 1884, and remained in operation until 1959. When roads was rebuilt over the dredge spoils in 1997 - 1998, many gold nuggets were found.

Murray's population was estimated at 500 in 1909, and was estimated at 100 in 1960.

Today
Today  Murray is inhabited by prospectors, loggers, and retirees. Two businesses remain open, the Sprag Pole Restaurant and Museum and the Bedroom Goldmine Bar. The Sprag Pole occupies one of the town's original buildings, built in 1884.

References

External links

Unincorporated communities in Shoshone County, Idaho
Unincorporated communities in Idaho
Mining communities in Idaho